The LJ Hooker League is a cricket competition on the NSW Far North Coast comprising teams from the Ballina, Casino, Lismore and Tweed District Cricket Associations.

The League was established in 1994/95 and superseded the top-grade of the Ballina, Casino and Lismore District Competitions.

After 13 seasons, in 2007 the Tweed District Cricket Association asked to join the league to form a larger 16-team competition. The Ballina clubs voted unanimously to join with the Tweed based clubs, but this was rejected by some Lismore-based teams. The league now comprises teams from Ballina, Casino, Lismore and Tweed districts since 2007/08.

Through the Far North Coast Cricket Council (region) and North Coastal Zone (zone), the LJ Hooker League feeds into Country Cricket New South Wales.

Premiers
1994/95: Northern Districts
1995/96: Ballina Bears
1996/97: Marist Brothers
1997/98: Southern Districts
1998/99: Casino Cavaliers
1999/00: Casino Cavaliers
2000/01: Tintenbar-East Ballina
2001/02: Alstonville
2002/03: Tintenbar-East Ballina
2003/04: Southern Districts
2004/05: Southern Districts
2005/06: Tintenbar-East Ballina
2006/07: Southern Districts
2007/08: Casino Cavaliers
2008/09: Ballina Bears
2009/10: Casino Cavaliers
2010/11: Casino Cavaliers
2011/12: Ballina Bears and Casino Cavaliers (joint premiers as final washed-out)
2012/13: Cudgen
2013/14: Ballina Bears
2014/15: Cudgen
2015/16: Cudgen
2016/17: Alstonville
2017/18: Cudgen
2018/19: Cudgen
2019/20: Cudgen

Player of the Year

The following players have been named as Player of the Year:

1994/95: Stuart Fielder (Marist Brothers)
1995/96: Bruce Jobson (Eastern Districts)
1996/97: Chris Matthews (Marist Brothers) and Shane Jacobs (Ballina Bears)
1997/98: Robert Parks (Brunswick-Byron), Stephen Ryan (Brunswick Byron) and Brett Crawford (Tintenbar-East Ballina)
1998/99: Steve Lockhart (Casino Cavaliers)
1999/00: Neil Hancock (Casino Cavaliers), Michael Holt(Northern Districts), Al Nowlan (Casino Cavaliers) and Scott Thompson (Brunswick Byron)
2000/01: Mark Bratti (Casino Cavaliers)
2001/02: Al Nowlan (Eastern Districts)
2002/03: Phil Alley (Tintenbar-East Ballina), Michael Nind (Southern Districts)
2003/04: Brett Crawford (Tintenbar-East Ballina)
2004/05: Bruce Jobson (Eastern Districts), Paul McLean (Southern Districts)
2005/06: Brett Crawford (Tintenbar-East Ballina)
2006/07: Paul McLean (Southern Districts)
2007/08: Brett Crawford (Tintenbar-East Ballina)
2008/09: Jason Caught (Lismore Workers)
2009/10: Jack Boote (South Tweed)
2010/11: Sam Adams (Ballina Bears)
2011/12: Sam Adams (Ballina Bears)
2012/13: Sam Adams (Ballina Bears)
2013/14: Greg Potter Alstonville
2014/15: Caleb Ziebell (Cudgen)
2015/16: Abe Crawford (Tintenbar-East Ballina)
2016/17: Caleb Ziebell (Cudgen)
2017/18: Caleb Ziebell (Cudgen)
2018/19: Caleb Ziebell (Cudgen) and Will Chapples (Murwillumbah)
2019/20: Jason Caught (Lismore Workers)

References

Australian domestic cricket competitions
 
Northern Rivers